State Route 203 (SR 203) is a primary state highway in the U.S. state of Virginia. Known for most of its length as Oldhams Road, the state highway runs  from SR 3 at Lyells north to SR 608 and SR 1007 in Kinsale. Though it runs in generally in an east–west direction, the route is signed north–south.

Route description

SR 203 begins at an intersection with SR 3 (Historyland Highway) at Lyells on the northern edge of Richmond County. The state highway heads east as Oldhams Road and enters Westmoreland County. SR 203 passes through Threeway and Oldhams before meeting SR 202 (Cople Highway) at Grays Corner. The two highways run concurrently southeast on Cople Highway before SR 203 splits to the northeast as Kinsale Road. Within the village of Kinsale, SR 203 passes through a pair of right-angle turns before reaching its northern terminus at the intersection of SR 608 and SR 1007. SR 608 heads north as a continuation of Kinsale Road, which uses the Kinsale Bridge to cross over the Kinsale Branch of the West Branch of the Yeocomico River.

Major intersections

References

External links

Virginia Highways Project: VA 203

203
State Route 203
State Route 203